Zildik is a rural locality (a selo) in Khivsky District, Republic of Dagestan, Russia. The population was 584 as of 2010. There are 5 streets.

Geography 
Zildik is located 18 km northeast of Khiv (the district's administrative centre) by road. Mezhgyul is the nearest rural locality.

References 

Rural localities in Khivsky District